Goetze or Götze is a German surname. It may refer to:

 Albrecht Goetze (1897–1971), German-American Hittitologist
 Auguste Götze (1840–1908), German singer, actress and vocal pedagogue
 Edmund Goetze (1843-1920), German literary historian and philologist
 Ekkeland Götze (born 1948), German artist and screenprinter*
 Emil Goetze (1856–1901), German tenor
 Fabian Götze (born 1990), German football player, who is a free agent now
 Felix Götze (born 1998), German football player
 Friedrich Götze (born 1951), German mathematician
 Hans Friedemann Götze (1897–1940), Nazi SS officer
 Mario Götze (born 1992), German football player
 Max Götze (1880–1944), German track cycling racer
 Paul Götze (1903–1948), Nazi SS officer at Auschwitz and Buchenwald concentration camps executed for war crimes
 Sigismund Goetze (1866–1939), British artist
 Vicki Goetze (born 1972), American golfing champion
 Volker Goetze (born 1972), German trumpeter
 Walter Goetze (1883–1961), German composer
 Wolfgang Götze (1937–2021), German theoretical physicist

See also
 Goetze's Candy Company, Baltimore, Maryland
 Goetze, a piston ring division of Federal-Mogul
 Goetze and Gwynn, organ-builders
 Goatse.cx, an Internet shock site

German-language surnames